Ayula (Ayulu) is a rural locality (a selo) in Anosinskoye Rural Settlement of Chemalsky District, the Altai Republic, Russia. The population was 295 as of 2016. There are 6 streets.

Geography 
Ayula is located in the valley of the Katun River, south from Gorno-Altaysk, 13 km north of Chemal (the district's administrative centre) by road. Chemal is the nearest rural locality.

References 

Rural localities in Chemalsky District